Sharon Renee Couch-Jewell (born September 13, 1967, in Richmond, Virginia) is an American track and field athlete who specialized in the long jump and sprint hurdles originating in Amelia, a small county in Virginia. She represented her country at the 1992 and 2000 Summer Olympics as well as one indoor and three outdoor World Championships.

Competition record

Personal bests
Outdoor
100 metres hurdles – 12.68 (+1.3 m/s, Sacramento 2000)
Long jump – 6.54 (0.0 m/s, Rio de Janeiro 1998)
Indoor
60 metres hurdles – 7.94 (New York 2000)
Long jump – 6.48 (Montreal 1997)

References

USATF profile

1967 births
Living people
Sportspeople from Richmond, Virginia
American female hurdlers
American female long jumpers
African-American female track and field athletes
American track and field coaches
Female sports coaches
Olympic track and field athletes of the United States
Athletes (track and field) at the 1992 Summer Olympics
Athletes (track and field) at the 2000 Summer Olympics
World Athletics Championships athletes for the United States
North Carolina Tar Heels women's track and field athletes
Track and field athletes from Virginia
Competitors at the 1998 Goodwill Games
21st-century African-American people
21st-century African-American women
20th-century African-American sportspeople
20th-century African-American women
20th-century African-American people